Jin-gyu, also spelled Jin-kyu or Chin-gyu, is a Korean masculine given name. People with this name include:
Kim Jin-kyu (actor) (1922–1998), South Korean actor, film director, and producer
Chyung Jinkyu (1939–2017), South Korean writer
Huh Chin-kyu (born 1940/1941), South Korean businessman, founder of Iljin Group
Jo Jin-kyu (born 1960), South Korean film director
Kang Jin-kyu (born 1983), South Korean football midfielder (Korea National League)
Kim Jin-kyu (born 1985), South Korean football defender (K League Classic)
Park Jin-kyu (born 1991), South Korean ice hockey player
Noh Jin-kyu (born 1992), South Korean short track speed skater
Tak Jin-kyu (born 1994), South Korean singer, member of Boys24/Unit Red
Lee Jin-gyu (born 2000), South Korean female ice hockey player

Korean masculine given names